Karl Ludwig Bernhard Christian Buchhorn (18 April 1770, in Halberstadt – 13 November 1856, in Berlin) was a German painter and engraver.

Life 
Between 1790 and 1793, Buchhorn was at the Prussian Academy of Arts. In addition to aquatint and lithography, Buchhorn adopted from his teachers a Crayon style.

In 1797, he got a job as a draftsman and engraver in Dessau, where he worked until 1803. He then worked for a time as a freelance artist.

In 1806, Buchhorn settled in Berlin and worked again with the Academy. He took over as the Kakademie  Ordinary Member in 1811, where he served three years later as a lecturer in drawing and engraving. In the same year Buchhorn founded with some colleagues the Berlinische Artists' Association.

After the death of his teacher Daniel Berger, Buchhorn was entrusted in 1824 with the leadership of the Academic engraving school. While teaching he had many disciples, among them were Friedrich Eduard Eichens, Rudolf Hertzberg, Hermann Kramer Edward Almond, Adolf Schrödter. At the age of 86 years he died on 13 November 1856 in Berlin.

In his early works, the Old Master was a big focus of his work. Influenced by Franz Krüger and Johann Gottfried Schadow, Buchhorn soon found a unique style and worked in his later works increasingly from nature. Portraits of Buchhorn were painted by Johann Carl Kretzschmar and Georg Friedrich Adolph Schöner.

Selected works 

 Fürst Leopold von Anhalt-Dessau (Portrait)
 Königin Luise (Portrait)
 Major Friedrich von Schill
 Die Betteljugend
 Im Krieg
 Soldaten an der Spree

See also
 List of German painters

1770 births
1856 deaths
18th-century German painters
18th-century German male artists
German male painters
19th-century German painters
19th-century German male artists
German engravers